Annie Dorothy Bridson (1893–1985) was a member of the House of Keys, Isle of Man, and the first woman president of the Manx Labour Party.

References

1893 births
1985 deaths
Manx Labour Party politicians